The Treaty of Coulaines, named after the western French locality of Coulaines near Le Mans, was concluded in late 843 between Charles the Bald, king of West Francia, and his nobility and clergy. Since its validity was limited to West Francia, it has been interpreted as marking the start of a divergence between the respective legal orders of what would become the Kingdom of France and the Kingdom of Germany, just a few months after the two realms had been defined by the Treaty of Verdun. The treaty restricted the powers of the king and guaranteed rights of the nobility and clergy. 

The treaty was concluded as Charles was coming back from an unsuccessful campaign against Brittany, in the form of a capitulary. In its chapters, the treaty delimits the spheres of power of the church, the nobility and the king, and places them in a legal reciprocal relationship. In particular, the defense of the church is attributed not only to the king, as had been the case previously, but jointly to the king and nobility. The treaty's second chapter defines royal power in terms of obedience from the king's vassals, in contrast to a notion of divine right of kings. Some historians such as  have interpreted it as an early kind of constitutional document.

Notes

References
 Classen, Peter: Die Verträge von Verdun und von Coulaines 843 als politische Grundlagen des westfränkischen Reiches. In: Ausgewählte Aufsätze von Peter Classen, J. Fleckenstein (Hg.), Sigmaringen 1983, S. 249–277 [zuerst 1963].
 Apsner, Burkhard: Vertrag und Konsens im früheren Mittelalter. Studien zu Gesellschaftsprogrammatik und Staatlichkeit im westfränkischen Reich (Trierer Historische Forschungen 58), Trier 2006.
 Krah, Adelheid, Die Entstehung der "potestas regia" im Westfrankenreich während der ersten Regierungsjahre Kaiser Karls II. (840–877), Berlin 2000, ISBN 3-05-003565-X,  Kapitel 3: Die konstitutionelle Basis: Die Verträge von Verdun und Coulaines als Ergebnisse der Bruderkriege S. 187–256.
 Magnou-Nortier, Elisabeth: Foi et Fidélité. Recherches sur l’évolution des liens personnels chez les Francs du VIIe au IXe siècle (Publications de l’université de Toulouse-Le Mirail, Serie A, Bd. 28), Toulouse 1976. 
 Penndorf, Ursula: Das Problem der „Reichseinheitsidee“ nach der Teilung von Verdun (843). Untersuchungen zu den späten Karolingern (Münchener Beiträge zur Mediävistik und Renaissance-Forschung, Bd. 20), München 1974.
 Schramm, Percy Ernst: Der König von Frankreich. Das Wesen der Monarchie vom 9. zum 16. Jh., Ein Kapitel aus der Geschichte des abendländischen Staates, Bd. 1, Darmstadt 1960.
 Zöllner, Erich: Die politische Stellung der Völker im Frankenreich (Veröffentlichungen des Instituts für österreichische Geschichtsforschung, L. Santifaller (Hg.), Bd.XIII ), Wien 1950.
 Latin text in Le Capitulaire de Coulaines

Coulaines
Carolingian dynasty
Constitutions of France